Our House is a British entertainment television programme. Broadcast on UKTV Style, it is a show which more thoroughly follows the DIY show fad of the late 1990s.

The object of the show is to take a dilapidated house and completely do it up into a "dream" house. The shows claims to: "bring together everything you need to know about creating your own dream home under one roof - expert advice, step-by-step DIY guides, tricks of the trade."

The show has a central presenter in Andrea McLean, and a series of experts, including: Harry Greene, Craig Phillips, Gavin Lowe, Steve Toms Fran McAteer, John Amabile and Tommy Walsh.

References

External links
Style at UKTV.co.uk

UKTV original programming